Sir Michael John Stevens,  (born 1958) is a British accountant and courtier.

Stevens was born in Southampton in 1958 and attended the University of Birmingham.

He worked for the accountants KPMG from 1979 to 1995, when he joined the Royal Collection Trust as Finance Director; in 2002, he became its Managing Director. In 2007 he was appointed Deputy Treasurer to the Queen and from 2011, he held this office jointly with that of Deputy Keeper of the Privy Purse. In 2018, he was promoted to Keeper of the Privy Purse, Treasurer to the Queen and Receiver-General of the Duchy of Lancaster, succeeding Sir Alan Reid.

For his services to the Royal Household and the Queen, Stevens was appointed a Lieutenant of the Royal Victorian Order in 2002 and promoted, firstly to Commander in 2009, and then to Knight Commander in 2017. He has also received the Queen Elizabeth II Version of the Royal Household Long and Faithful Service Medal in 2015 for 20 years of service to the British Royal Family.

References 

Living people
1958 births
British accountants
Members of the British Royal Household
Alumni of the University of Birmingham
Knights Commander of the Royal Victorian Order